Jackie Chan: My Stunts is a 1999 documentary about Jackie Chan's stunts, fights, and other related things and how he performs them. Throughout the film Jackie gives quick tutorials on how to execute various fight scenes under a budget.

Cast
Jackie Chan as himself
Ron Smoorenburg as himself (making of Who Am I?)
Kwan Yung as himself (making of Who Am I?)
Yuen Biao (The Young Master footage)
Danielle Chau
Reuben Langdon

Jackie Chan Stunt Team
Ken Lo as himself
Brad Allan as himself
Paul Andreovski as himself (making of Who Am I?)
Mars as himself
Anthony Carpio as himself
Nicky Li as himself
Rocky Lai as himself
Johnny Cheung as himself
Louis Keung as himself
Sam Wong as himself
Chan Man Ching as himself
Andy Cheng as himself
Rocky Cheung as himself
Jack Wong as himself

See also
Jackie Chan filmography
Jackie Chan Stunt Team

External links

1999 films
1990s Cantonese-language films
1990s English-language films
Documentary films about actors
Documentary films about singers
Documentary films about film directors and producers
Documentary films about the film industry
Films about stunt performers
Films directed by Jackie Chan
Hong Kong martial arts films
1990s Hong Kong films